Raymond is a census-designated place in eastern Liberty Township, Union County, Ohio, United States.  It has a post office with the ZIP code 43067.  It is located at the intersection of State Routes 347 and 739.

History
Raymond was originally called Newton; the settlement was laid out and platted in 1838. The post office in Newton was opened in 1839, and three of the first six postmasters had the surname Raymond. Over time the settlement acquired the sobriquet "Raymond's post office." This was eventually shortened to "Raymond's P.O.," then to "Raymond's," then to "Raymonds," and finally to Raymond. The sign currently on the front of the Raymond post office is a representation of the signage that once adorned the Toledo & Ohio Central railroad station located on the south edge of the town.

Education
Raymond has a public library, a branch of the Marysville Public Library.

References

Unincorporated communities in Union County, Ohio
Unincorporated communities in Ohio